Raiwind Ijtema is an annual three-day congregation held at Raiwind Markaz, Lahore, Pakistan.

The congregation is attended by thousands of people across the world every year. After Dua of last day, groups (Tablighi Jamaat) are formed that go to different parts of the world to preach, and the process continues until the next Ijtima.

History
In 2011 the congregation divided into two phases due to administrative and security reasons.

See also
 Bishwa Ijtema

References

Events in Pakistan
21st century in Pakistan
Annual events
Tablighi Jamaat
Islam in Pakistan
Islamic organisations based in Pakistan
Sunni Islamist groups
November events